LOC, L.O.C., Loc, LoC, or locs may refer to:

Places  
 Lóc, a village in Sângeorgiu de Pădure, Mureș County, Romania
 Lócs, a village in Vas county, Hungary
 Line of Contact, meeting place of Western and Eastern Allied forces at the end of World War II in Europe (1945)
 Line of Control, a ceasefire line between Indian- and Pakistani-controlled parts of Kashmir (1972–present)
 Locwood stop, Hong Kong, MTR station code
 Line of Contact (Nagorno-Karabakh) between Armenian and Azerbaijani forces (1994–present)

People with the name
 L.O.C. (rapper) (born 1979), Danish rapper
 Goldie Loc  (born 1980), American rapper
 Spider Loc (born 1979), American rapper
 Tone Lōc (born 1966), American hip-hop artist and director
 Laughlin Phillips or Loc (1924–2010),  American museum director

Arts, entertainment, and media
 LOC: Kargil, a 2003 Indian war film.
 OG Loc, fictional character in the video game Grand Theft Auto: San Andreas
 Steel Battalion: Line of Contact or LoC, a 2004 videogame
 Level of Concern, a 2020 single from Twenty One Pilots

Medicine
 LOC, a medical acronym for Level of consciousness, a medical assessment of a patient's presence or degree of altered level of consciousness
Laryngo-onycho-cutaneous syndrome

Organizations 
 LeMoyne–Owen College, a historically black college in Memphis, Tennessee
 Library of Congress, the de facto national library of the United States
  or Communist Workers League, a Trotskyist group in Spain active from 1976 to 1990
 Loc Publishing, an imprint of VDM Publishing

Other uses 
 Lab-on-a-chip, a device that integrates multiple laboratory functions on a single chip
 Letter of Credit LoC or L/C, is a letter from a bank or insurance company guaranteeing that a buyer's payment to a seller will be received on time and for the correct amount
 Limit of convection or equilibrium level, the height at which a rising parcel of air is at the same temperature as its environment
 Limiting oxygen concentration, the limiting concentration of oxygen below which combustion is not possible
 Lines of code, a software metric used to measure the size of a software program
 Liquid Organic Cleaner, a product of Amway from 1959
 LOC record, geolocation information resource record in Domain Name System
 Locs, a synonym for dreadlocks
 Look out circular, a message used by Interpol in India to stop wanted people from leaving the country
 Loss of control (aeronautics), one of the causes to aircraft accidents.
 Localizer (aviation)
 Local organizing committee

See also
 Loc River